Victoria Cross is a future underground rapid transit station, to be located beneath the central business district of North Sydney, Australia. The station forms part of Transport for NSW's Sydney Metro City & Southwest scheme. It is scheduled to open in 2024.

A station at Victoria Cross was proposed in 2001 as part of Co-ordinator General of Rail Ron Christie's Strategic Plan for Rail, as a stop for trains travelling to the north-west, Northern Beaches, Cronulla and Macarthur. The new station – a block away from the existing station in Blue Street – was designed to take pressure off the constrained interchange, which dates from 1932. The NSW Government incorporated many of Christie's ideas in its Metropolitan Rail Expansion Program (MREP) in 2005, including Victoria Cross station as part of a future Redfern to Chatswood railway line. When the MREP was cancelled in 2008, the idea of a station at Victoria Cross was dropped as well.

The concept of a Redfern to Chatswood line was partially revived by the NSW Government as part of the Sydney's Rail Future plan in 2012, this time as a metro stop. A detailed concept plan, including a station at Victoria Cross, went on public exhibition in 2015. The station entrance will be on the eastern side of Miller Street between Berry and Mount Streets.

In June 2017 changes were announced including an additional station entrance on McLaren Street. The second entrance is notable for being the first lift-only entrance to a passenger train station in Australia, and consists of 4 lifts capable of carrying 27 people each.

References

External links
Victoria Cross station Sydney Metro

Proposed railway stations in Sydney

Railway stations scheduled to open in 2024
North Sydney, New South Wales